In mathematical analysis, the intermediate value theorem states that if  is a continuous function whose domain contains the interval , then it takes on any given value between  and  at some point within the interval.

This has two important corollaries:

 If a continuous function has values of opposite sign inside an interval, then it has a root in that interval (Bolzano's theorem). 
 The image of a continuous function over an interval is itself an interval.

Motivation

It represents the idea that the graph of a continuous function on a closed interval can be drawn without lifting a pencil from the paper.

Theorem
The intermediate value theorem states the following:

Consider an interval  of real numbers  and a continuous function . Then

Version II. the image set  is also an interval, and it contains ,

Remark: Version II states that the set of function values has no gap.
A subset of the real numbers with no internal gap is an interval. Version I is naturally contained in Version II.

Relation to completeness
The theorem depends on, and is equivalent to, the completeness of the real numbers. The intermediate value theorem does not apply to the rational numbers Q because gaps exist between rational numbers; irrational numbers fill those gaps. However, there is no rational number  such that , because  is an irrational number.

Proof

The theorem may be proven as a consequence of the completeness property of the real numbers as follows:

We shall prove the first case, . The second case is similar.

Let  be the set of all  such that . We claim that .

Since  is continuous, there is a  such that  whenever . This means that

for all .

This means that

Both inequalities

are valid for all , from which we deduce  as the only possible value, as stated.

Remark: The intermediate value theorem can also be proved using the methods of non-standard analysis, which places "intuitive" arguments involving infinitesimals on a rigorous  footing.

History
A form of the theorem was postulated as early as the 5th century BCE, in the work of Bryson of Heraclea on squaring the circle. Bryson argued that, as circles larger than and smaller than a given square both exist, there must exist a circle of equal area. The theorem was first proved by Bernard Bolzano in 1817. Bolzano used the following formulation of the theorem:

The equivalence between this formulation and the modern one can be shown by setting  to the appropriate constant function. Augustin-Louis Cauchy provided the modern formulation and a proof in 1821. Both were inspired by the goal of formalizing the analysis of functions and the work of Joseph-Louis Lagrange. The idea that continuous functions possess the intermediate value property has an earlier origin. Simon Stevin proved the intermediate value theorem for polynomials (using a cubic as an example) by providing an algorithm for constructing the decimal expansion of the solution.  The algorithm iteratively subdivides the interval into 10 parts, producing an additional decimal digit at each step of the iteration. Before the formal definition of continuity was given, the intermediate value property was given as part of the definition of a continuous function. Proponents include Louis Arbogast, who assumed the functions to have no jumps, satisfy the intermediate value property and have increments whose sizes corresponded to the sizes of the increments of the variable.
Earlier authors held the result to be intuitively obvious and requiring no proof.  The insight of Bolzano and Cauchy was to define a general notion of continuity (in terms of infinitesimals in Cauchy's case and using real inequalities in Bolzano's case), and to provide a proof based on such definitions.

Generalizations

The intermediate value theorem is closely linked to the topological notion of connectedness and follows from the basic properties of connected sets in metric spaces and connected subsets of R in particular:
(*)
 A subset  is connected if and only if it satisfies the following property: . (**)

The preservation of connectedness under continuous maps can be thought of as a generalization of the intermediate value theorem, a property of real valued functions of a real variable, to continuous functions in general spaces.

Recall the first version of the intermediate value theorem, stated previously:

The intermediate value theorem is an immediate consequence of these two properties of connectedness:

The original theorem is recovered by noting that  is connected and that its natural topology is the order topology.

The Brouwer fixed-point theorem is a related theorem that, in one dimension, gives a special case of the intermediate value theorem.

Converse is false

The intermediate value theorem says that every continuous function is a Darboux function. However, not every Darboux function is continuous; i.e., the converse of the intermediate value theorem is false.

Another, more complicated example is given by the Conway base 13 function.

In fact, Darboux's theorem states that all functions that result from the differentiation of some other function on some interval have the intermediate value property (even though they need not be continuous).

Historically, this intermediate value property has been suggested as a definition for continuity of real-valued functions; this definition was not adopted.

In constructive mathematics

In constructive mathematics, the intermediate value theorem is not true. Instead, one has to weaken the conclusion:

Then for every positive number  there exists a point  in the unit interval such that .

Practical applications
A similar result is the Borsuk–Ulam theorem, which says that a continuous map from the -sphere to Euclidean -space will always map some pair of antipodal points to the same place.

In general, for any continuous function whose domain is some closed convex  shape and any point inside the shape (not necessarily its center), there exist two antipodal points with respect to the given point whose functional value is the same.

The theorem also underpins the explanation of why rotating a wobbly table will bring it to stability (subject to certain easily  met constraints).

See also

References

External links

 Intermediate value Theorem - Bolzano Theorem at cut-the-knot
 Bolzano's Theorem by Julio Cesar de la Yncera, Wolfram Demonstrations Project.
 
 
 Mizar system proof: http://mizar.org/version/current/html/topreal5.html#T4

Theory of continuous functions
Articles containing proofs
Theorems in calculus
Theorems in real analysis